Bunya is a settlement in the north of Namibia.

Major employers in the village include a Catholic mission and a hospital, while other residents derive their income from farming. The village school, Bunya Combined School, provides places for children in grades one to ten. A bakery supplies bread; other produce is bought from larger nearby towns.

References

Populated places in Kavango West